The Peace Bridge robins were a family of American robins that nested for several years in the 1930s on the Canadian side of the Peace Bridge, which connects Buffalo, New York to Fort Erie, Ontario. The robins became a minor tourist attraction for visitors to the area after spending 15 days in a futile 1935 attempt to build a nest on a narrow ledge at the Canadian immigration office adjacent to the bridge. Only after officials widened the ledge did the robins successfully nest, and thereupon returned to the spot for several years afterward. The robins were featured in postcards and were somewhat tamed by frequent feedings from government workers.

See also
 List of individual birds

References 
 "Robin Eggs on Peace Bridge", The New York Times. April 25, 1935.
 The Canadian Press. "Famous robins return to nest at Peace Bridge", The New York Times. April 12, 1936. Page 6.

Urban wildlife
Individual songbirds
Fort Erie, Ontario
1935 in Canada
1930s in Ontario